Manruta is a genus of moths of the family Noctuidae. It was first described by Smith in 1903 and is part of the Manruta Family, with no subspecies.

Species
 Manruta elingua Smith, 1903

References

Natural History Museum Lepidoptera genus database
Manruta at funet
Species Eucoptocnemis elingua

Noctuinae